Pandrosos is a genus of beetles in the family Cerambycidae, containing the following species:

 Pandrosos phthisicus (Klug, 1825)
 Pandrosos proximus Mermudes & Napp, 2009

References

Rhinotragini